The 2003 Cincinnati Reds season was the 134th season for the franchise in Major League Baseball, and their first season at Great American Ball Park in Cincinnati. They failed to improve on their 78–84 record from 2002 and missed the playoffs for the 9th consecutive season.

Offseason
 November 18, 2002: Ryan Freel was signed as a free agent by the Reds.
 December 15, 2002: Elmer Dessens and cash were traded by the Reds to the Arizona Diamondbacks as part of a 4-team trade. The Toronto Blue Jays sent Felipe López to the Reds. The Diamondbacks sent Erubiel Durazo to the Oakland Athletics. The Athletics sent a player to be named later to the Blue Jays. The Athletics completed the deal by sending Jason Arnold (minors) to the Blue Jays on December 16.
 January 22, 2003: Josías Manzanillo was signed as a free agent with the Cincinnati Reds.

Regular season

Season summary
The Reds finished in fifth place in their division, nineteen games behind the division winner, the Chicago Cubs. They finished with a record of 69-93 and a winning percentage of .421. The Reds finished eighteen games behind the second place team, the Houston Astros. They finished sixteen games behind the third place team, the St. Louis Cardinals. They finished six games behind the fourth place team, the Pittsburgh Pirates, and one game ahead of the sixth place team, the Milwaukee Brewers.

In the middle of the season, the Reds fired manager Bob Boone and promoted Louisville Bats manager Dave Miley to interim manager.

Season standings

National League Central

Record vs. opponents

Notable transactions
 July 30, 2003: José Guillén was traded by the Reds to the Oakland Athletics for Aaron Harang, Joe Valentine, and Jeff Bruksch (minors).
 August 24, 2003: Scott Service was signed as a free agent by the Reds.

Roster

Player stats

Batting

Starters by position 
Note: Pos = Position; G = Games played; AB = At bats; H = Hits; Avg. = Batting average; HR = Home runs; RBI = Runs batted in

Other batters 
Note: G = Games played; AB = At bats; H = Hits; Avg. = Batting average; HR = Home runs; RBI = Runs batted in

Pitching

Starting pitchers 
Note: G = Games pitched; IP = Innings pitched; W = Wins; L = Losses; ERA = Earned run average; SO = Strikeouts

Other pitchers 
Note: G = Games pitched; IP = Innings pitched; W = Wins; L = Losses; ERA = Earned run average; SO = Strikeouts

Relief pitchers 
Note: G = Games pitched; W = Wins; L = Losses; SV = Saves; ERA = Earned run average; SO = Strikeouts

Farm system 

LEAGUE CHAMPIONS: Billings

References

External links
2003 Cincinnati Reds at Baseball Reference
Season standings: National League Central Standings on ESPN.com
Batting statistics: Cincinnati Reds Batting Stats on ESPN.com
Pitching statistics: Cincinnati Reds Pitching Stats on ESPN.com

Cincinnati Reds seasons
Cincinnati Reds season
Cinc